Lâcher prise, also known in English as Freefall or Let Go, is a Canadian television comedy series, which premiered in 2017 on Ici Radio-Canada Télé. The series stars Sophie Cadieux as Valérie Danault, a single mother struggling to keep it together after suffering burnout in her professional and personal life.

The cast also includes Sylvie Léonard as her mother Madeleine; Simon Lacroix as her ex-husband Éric, who left her when he came out as gay; Éric Paulhus as his new husband Kevin; and Antoine Archambault as her son Thomas; as well as Jean-Moïse Martin, Christine Beaulieu, Gildor Roy, Emmanuel Schwartz, Suzanne Champagne and Émilie Bierre.

In 2018, OutTV added the program to its schedule, airing it under the title Freefall with English language subtitles, while the series has been released internationally on Prime Video under the title Let Go.

The series ended in 2020, after the fourth season.

Awards and nominations

References

External links

2017 Canadian television series debuts
2020 Canadian television series endings
2010s Canadian sitcoms
2020s Canadian sitcoms
2010s Canadian LGBT-related comedy television series
2020s Canadian LGBT-related comedy television series
Ici Radio-Canada Télé original programming
Television shows set in Montreal
Canadian LGBT-related sitcoms